The Ekman layer is the layer in a fluid where there is a force balance between pressure gradient force, Coriolis force and turbulent drag. It was first described by Vagn Walfrid Ekman. Ekman layers occur both in the atmosphere and in the ocean.

There are two types of Ekman layers. The first type occurs at the surface of the ocean and is forced by surface winds, which act as a drag on the surface of the ocean. The second type occurs at the bottom of the atmosphere and ocean, where frictional forces are associated with flow over rough surfaces.

History
Ekman developed the theory of the Ekman layer after Fridtjof Nansen observed that ice drifts at an angle of 20°–40° to the right of the prevailing wind direction while on an Arctic expedition aboard the Fram. Nansen asked his colleague, Vilhelm Bjerknes to set one of his students upon study of the problem. Bjerknes tapped Ekman, who presented his results in 1902 as his doctoral thesis.

Mathematical formulation

The mathematical formulation of the Ekman layer begins by assuming a neutrally stratified fluid, a balance between the forces of pressure gradient, Coriolis and turbulent drag.

Note that  is a modified pressure: we have incorporated the hydrostatic of the pressure, to take account of gravity.

There are many regions where an Ekman layer is theoretically plausible; they include the bottom of the atmosphere, near the surface of the earth and ocean, the bottom of the ocean, near the sea floor and at the top of the ocean, near the air-water interface. Different boundary conditions are appropriate for each of these different situations. Each of these situations can be accounted for through the boundary conditions applied to the resulting system of ordinary differential equations. The separate cases of top and bottom boundary layers are shown below.

Ekman layer at the ocean (or free) surface

We will consider boundary conditions of the Ekman layer in the upper ocean:

Solution

These differential equations can be solved to find:

The value  is called the Ekman layer depth, and gives an indication of the penetration depth of wind-induced turbulent mixing in the ocean. For a typical  m/s, and at 45° latitude ( s), then  is approximately 45 meters. This Ekman depth prediction does not always agree precisely with observations.

This variation of horizontal velocity with depth is referred to as the Ekman spiral, diagrammed above and at right.

By applying the continuity equation we can have the vertical velocity as following

Note that when vertically-integrated, the volume transport associated with the Ekman spiral is to the right of the wind direction in the Northern Hemisphere.

Ekman layer at the bottom of the ocean and atmosphere

The traditional development of Ekman layers bounded below by a surface utilizes two boundary conditions:
 A no-slip condition at the surface;
 The Ekman velocities approaching the geostrophic velocities as  goes to infinity.

Experimental observations of the Ekman layer
There is much difficulty associated with observing the Ekman layer for two main reasons: the theory is too simplistic as it assumes a constant eddy viscosity, which Ekman himself anticipated, saying

and because it is difficult to design instruments with great enough sensitivity to observe the velocity profile in the ocean.

Laboratory demonstrations
The bottom Ekman layer can readily be observed in a rotating cylindrical tank of water by dropping in dye and changing the rotation rate slightly.  Surface Ekman layers can also be observed in rotating tanks.

In the atmosphere
In the atmosphere, the Ekman solution generally overstates the magnitude of the horizontal wind field because it does not account for the velocity shear in the surface layer. Splitting the planetary boundary layer into the surface layer and the Ekman layer generally yields more accurate results.

In the ocean
The Ekman layer, with its distinguishing feature the Ekman spiral, is rarely observed in the ocean. The Ekman layer near the surface of the ocean extends only about 10 – 20 meters deep, and instrumentation sensitive enough to observe a velocity profile in such a shallow depth has only been available since around 1980. Also, wind waves modify the flow near the surface, and make observations close to the surface rather difficult.

Instrumentation
Observations of the Ekman layer have only been possible since the development of robust surface moorings and sensitive current meters. Ekman himself developed a current meter to observe the spiral that bears his name, but was not successful.
The Vector Measuring Current Meter  and the Acoustic Doppler Current Profiler are both used to measure current.

Observations
The first documented observations of an Ekman-like spiral in the ocean were made in the Arctic Ocean from a drifting ice floe in 1958. More recent observations include (not an exhaustive list):
 The 1980 mixed layer experiment
 Within the Sargasso  Sea  during the 1982 Long Term Upper Ocean Study 
 Within the California Current during the 1993 Eastern Boundary Current experiment 
 Within the Drake Passage region of the Southern Ocean 
 In the eastern tropical Pacific, at 2°N, 140°W, using 5 current meters between 5 and 25 meters depth. This study noted that the geostrophic shear associated with tropical stability waves modified the Ekman spiral relative to what is expected with horizontally uniform density.
 North of the Kerguelen Plateau during the 2008 SOFINE experiment 
Common to several of these observations spirals were found to be "compressed", displaying larger estimates of eddy viscosity when considering the rate of rotation with depth than the eddy viscosity derived from considering the rate of decay of speed.

See also

References

External links 
Bottom Ekman layer lab demonstration 
Surface Ekman layer lab demonstration

Boundary layer meteorology
Oceanography

fr:Spirale d'Ekman#Couche d'Ekman